Samuel Rich House is a historic home located at Penfield in Monroe County, New York. It was originally built in 1816 as a -story, gable-roofed frame dwelling in the rural vernacular building tradition.  It was substantially enlarged in 1832 with the addition of an elegant 2-story, five-bay, Federal style, hipped roof, main block.  Also on the property are three contributing structures: a chicken coop, brick smokehouse, and the stone foundation of a frame barn.

It was listed on the National Register of Historic Places in 1987.

References

Houses on the National Register of Historic Places in New York (state)
Federal architecture in New York (state)
Houses completed in 1816
Houses in Monroe County, New York
1816 establishments in New York (state)
National Register of Historic Places in Monroe County, New York